Sarreguemines (German: Saargemünd , Lorraine Franconian: Saargemìnn) is a commune in the Moselle department of the Grand Est administrative region in north-eastern France.

It is the seat of an arrondissement and a canton. At the 2013 France census, the town's population was 21,572. The inhabitants of the commune are known as Sarregueminois and Sarregueminoises.

Geography
Sarreguemines station has rail connections to Strasbourg, Saarbrücken and Metz. Traditionally Sarreguemines was the head of river navigation on the Saar, its importance being a depot where boats were unloaded.

Population

Administration
Sarreguemines was, from 1985 to 2015, the seat of two cantons:
 Sarreguemines, consisting of the Sarreguemines commune only.
 Sarreguemines-Campagne, comprising 21 nearby communes.

Both cantons, minus the communes of Grundviller, Guebenhouse, Loupershouse and Woustviller that were added to the canton of Sarralbe, were merged into one canton of Sarreguemines on January 1, 2015.

History
Sarreguemines, originally a Roman settlement, obtained civic rights early in the 13th century. In 1297 it was ceded by the count of Saarbrücken to the Duke of Lorraine, and passed with Lorraine in 1766 to France.

It was transferred to Germany in 1871, with the Treaty of Frankfurt following the Franco-Prussian War. From 1871 to 1918 it formed part of the German imperial province of Alsace-Lorraine and manufactured plush velvet, leather, faience and porcelain, and was a centre for making papier-mâché boxes, mostly used for snuffboxes. It was returned to France after World War I.

On December 21–23, 1944, the 44th Infantry Division (United States) threw back three attempts by the Germans to cross the Blies River. An aggressive defense of the Sarreguemines area was continued throughout February and most of March 1945.

Notable people
Sarreguemines was the birthplace of :
 Jean-Pierre Bachasson, comte de Montalivet (1766–1823), Peer of France and a French statesman
 Auguste Hilarion Touret (1797 – 1858) - French philhellene officer and a participant in the War of Independence of Greece
 Hans Traut (1895-1974), general
 Marianne Oswald (1901-1985), singer
 Karl Ullrich (1910-1996), Knights Cross holder
 Eugen-Ludwig Zweigart (1914-1944), pilot
 Céleste Lett (born 1951), politician
 Michel Roth (born 1959), chef
 Eric Hassli (born 1981), French footballer
 Lucien Schmitthäusler (1935–2020), writer and educator
 Matthieu Sprick (born 1981), French cyclist
 Erza Muqoli (born 2005), French singer

See also
 Communes of the Moselle department

References

External links

 
 http://realtravel.com/sarreguemines-lorraine-travel-guide-d1772892-1.html
 http://www.travelpost.com/EU/France/Lorraine/Saargemund/6224215
 http://www.voyage-scolaire.com/france/sarregms/index.html
 http://www.sarreguemines-museum.com
 Médiathèque d'Agglomération Sarreguemines Confluences

Communes of Moselle (department)
Subprefectures in France
Moselle communes articles needing translation from French Wikipedia
Duchy of Lorraine